Puerto Limón is a settlement in the municipality of Mocoa, in the Putumayo department of Colombia.

Climate
Puerto Limón has a wet tropical rainforest climate (Af) with heavy rainfall year-round.

References

Populated places in the Putumayo Department